Rudolf Hitrec (12 April 1903 in Zagreb – 13 January 1970 in Zagreb) was a Croatian footballer and international manager.

Club career
He played for Concordia Zagreb from 1919 to 1921 and Građanski Zagreb from 1921 to 1930. He won the national championship of the Kingdom of Serbs, Croats and Slovenes in 1923, 1926 and 1928.

International career
Hitrec played for the Yugoslav national team once in 1926 against Bulgaria in Zagreb.

Post-playing career
In 1941 he became the president of the Croatian Football Federation and also served as the manager of the Croatian national team from 1940 to 1943. After the Second World War he ended his career in football and worked at the Dubrava Clinical Hospital as a doctor.

References

"Rudolf Hitrec", Nogometni leksikon, Miroslav Krleža Lexicographical Institute. Zagreb, 2004.

External links
 

1903 births
1970 deaths
Footballers from Zagreb
Association football midfielders
Yugoslav footballers
Yugoslavia international footballers
HŠK Concordia players
HŠK Građanski Zagreb players
Yugoslav First League players
Croatian football managers
Croatia national football team managers
Presidents of the Croatian Football Federation